Matt Fuller is a rugby union player.

Matt or Matthew Fuller may also refer to:

 Matt Fuller (Australian rules footballer), drafted by Western Bulldogs in the 2013 AFL Draft
 Matthew Fuller (author), 20th century British writer on media theory 
 Matthew Fuller, character in The Accidental Time Machine
 Matthew le Fuller, MP for Wycombe (UK Parliament constituency)